This is a list of legal and educational institutions named Thomas More.

Legal institutions
Thomas More Building at the Royal Courts of Justice in The Strand, London
 Thomas More Courts, courts of the Chancery Division of the High Court of Justice
Thomas More Law Center, legal aid organization
Thomas More Society, legal defense organization

Educational and religious institutions

United Kingdom
 St Thomas More’s Catholic Church, Hollingbury, Brighton, East Sussex
 Church of St Thomas More, Seaford, East Sussex
 Church of Our Most Holy Redeemer and St Thomas More, Chelsea, London
 St Thomas More Catholic School, Bedford, Bedfordshire
 St Thomas More Catholic School, Blaydon, Tyne and Wear
 St Thomas More Catholic School, Buxton, Derbyshire
 St Thomas More Catholic School, Crewe, Cheshire
 St Thomas More Catholic School, Eltham, London
 St Thomas More Catholic School, Nuneaton, Warwickshire
 St Thomas More Catholic School, Willenhall, West Midlands
 St Thomas More Catholic School, Wood Green, London
 St Thomas More Catholic Academy, Stoke-on-Trent
 St Thomas More Church, Dulwich, London
 St Thomas More High School, Westcliff-on-Sea, Essex
 St Thomas More RC Academy, North Shields, Tyne and Wear
 St Thomas More Roman Catholic College, Denton, Greater Manchester
 Ss John Fisher and Thomas More RC High School, Colne, Lancashire
 St Thomas More Roman Catholic Church, Bradford-on-Avon, a church in Wiltshire
 St Thomas More Language College, Chelsea, London
 Thomas More Catholic School, Purley, London
 St Thomas More’s Catholic Primary School, Hampshire

United States

Cathedral of Saint Thomas More (Arlington), Virginia
Co-Cathedral of Saint Thomas More (Tallahassee, Florida)
College of Saints John Fisher & Thomas More, Fort Worth, Texas
St. Thomas More Academy, Raleigh, North Carolina
St. Thomas More Church, Chapel Hill, North Carolina
St. Thomas More Academy (Burton, Michigan)
St. Thomas More Academy (Delaware), Magnolia, Delaware
St. Thomas More Church (New York City)
St. Thomas More High School (Champaign, Illinois)
Saint Thomas More High School (Milwaukee), Wisconsin
St. Thomas More Middle & High School (South Dakota), Rapid City, South Dakota
Saint Thomas More Parish, Durham, New Hampshire
St. Thomas More Parish (Narragansett, Rhode Island)
St. Thomas More School (Connecticut), Oakdale, Connecticut
St. Thomas More School (Louisiana), Lafayette, Louisiana
St. Thomas More School (Decatur), Georgia
St. Thomas More Church (Decatur), Georgia
Thomas More College of Liberal Arts, Merrimack, New Hampshire
Thomas More College (New York City), a former women's college of Fordham University
Thomas More Prep-Marian High School, Hays, Kansas
Thomas More School (San Jose, California)
Thomas More University, Crestview Hills, Kentucky

Canada
St. Thomas More College, Saskatoon, Saskatchewan, Canada,
St. Thomas More Catholic Secondary School, Hamilton, Ontario, Canada
St. Thomas More Collegiate, Burnaby, British Columbia, Canada

Kenya
St. Thomas More Building of Strathmore University Law School, Nairobi, Kenya

Nicaragua
Thomas More Universitas, Managua, Nicaragua

South Africa
Thomas More College (South Africa), Kloof, Durban, South Africa

India
St. Thomas More Church, Alakode (Meenmutty), India

Australia
St Thomas More College, Sunnybank , Brisbane, Australia
Thomas More College (South Australia), Salisbury Downs, South Australia

Malaysia
Church of St Thomas More, Subang Jaya, Malaysia

Philippines
St. Thomas More Academy (Philippines)

More, Thomas